Andrew Carl Bennett (December 17, 1889November 29, 1971)  often nicknamed 'A.C. Bennett' was a United States Navy rear admiral (upper half) and United States Naval Submariner. Commissioned from Annapolis in 1912. Commanding Officer of the Submarine L-11 in Irish waters 1917-1918. Commanding Officer of R-24 and S-16 1918-1922. Instructor at Annapolis 1933-1936. Commanding Officer of the Savannah 1940-1942. Rear Admiral in May 1942. Commander of the Advance Group, Amphibious Force July 1942-February 1943 then Navy Operating Base, Iceland in 1943, Rear Adm. Andrew C. Bennett, USN, assumed command as Commandant, Eighth Naval District, on 14 June 1943.  He retired as a Rear Admiral in the U.S. Navy in 1946.

Retired in November 1946. Decorations included the Navy Cross and two Legions of Merit.

External links

 

Burials at Arlington National Cemetery
Recipients of the Navy Cross (United States)
United States Naval Academy alumni
United States Navy rear admirals
United States Navy World War II admirals
1889 births
1971 deaths
United States Navy personnel of World War I